Bray Wilkins (probably pronounced  based on contemporaneous spelling Brey Wilkeens;  1610 – 1 January 1702) was an immigrant, patriarch, and founder of Middleton, Massachusetts. Bray's origins aren't concretely known and are supplanted (and probably distorted) by familial tradition, however his reputation was already prolific in the Massachusetts Bay Colony decades before his death. His progeny, the Wilkins family, had a strong presence in the area. Bray and his family were prominent figures in some Salem Witch Trials.

Early life
Very little is known about Bray's life before emigrating to the Massachusetts Bay Colony. It is known from his own admission and other records which required such information that Bray was born about 1610. Being an immigrant, it is presumed Bray hailed from the Kingdom of England, but exactly where he was born is up for debate. The prevailing assumption is that Bray came from modern-day Wales; it is sometimes suggested he was born in Brecknockshire, however, this is evidently based on the mistaken assumption that Bray was a descendant of the Bishop of Chester, John Wilkins, who married the sister of Oliver Cromwell, the fact that John Wilkins was born more than four years after Bray often overlooked. The authors of several historical works on old Salem and New England make significantly similar claims that Bray was a descendant, in varying forms, of the lordly Wilkins families in Wales. William C. Hill states it is "quite likely" that Bray heralded from one of these Wilkins families, whose presence in Wales is well attested. That being said, Bray's immediate origins are still nonetheless a mystery. "Thorough inquiry" conducted by English and Welsh genealogical authorities have found no definite trace of Bray or his immediate ancestors.

Immigration and life in Massachusetts
Regardless of his origins, Bray arrived in the Thirteen Colonies around 1630, his first residence being recorded as Lynn, Massachusetts. A tradition existed by the mid-twentieth century that Bray had emigrated to the New World with John Endecott, but a lack of extant immigration records from the time period prevents such a connection from being substantiated. The first certain attestation of Bray's presence in the Colonies is a parchment dated January 16, 1632 which describes the allotment of 16 acres of Dorchester to him.  He is registered as have taken the Oath of a Freeman on May 14, 1634.

Bray was known by the community as a model citizen: upright, pious, and adored. In 1658, Bray and his partner John Gengell (of uncertain relations, see below) leased 700 acres of land eight to ten miles northwest of Salem, which became the town of Danvers, and later Middleton. Soon afterwards, the two men moved their entire families to the land, and established homesteads. Wilkins and Gengell soon began logging and timber-processing operations, and at first, their business prospered. One of Bray's sons apparently boasted to a friend that the family operation produced 20,000 barrel staves and 6,000 feet of boards, however, in terms of profitability, the operation was marginal. In 1661, Bray was arrested and charged with theft, later admitting to stealing hay in order to feed his oxen with which he transported his timber to Salem. As embarrassing as the incident was to the family's reputation, an even greater setback would occur in 1666, when a controversial mortgage claim led to Bray and Gengell being brought to court. Bray's home had burned down during the winter of 1664, and eventually he and Gengell were unable to continue making their mortgage payments, and were forced to sell 2/3 of their lands, which even then did not allow them to repay their debts. Eventually, the one who the duo had purchased their lands from, Richard Bellingham, who was also the royal governor of the Massachusetts Colony, brought them to court. Ultimately, Bellingham won his foreclosure judgement, and his lawyers seized Wilkins and Gengell's assets, along with their stocks of shingles. Eventually, Wilkins was able to finally pay off his debts and retain some of his land, but the experience left him with the view that farming was the only reliable way to have a secure living.

Salem Witch Trials
In 1689, Bray and his family, along with several others, moved from Salem proper to establish a church in Danvers. Around 1690, Bray's granddaughter by his son Thomas, Margaret, married a man by the name of John Willard. Willard acted as a constable for the court, and given Bray's legal misfortunes decades prior, the family disapproved of him immediately after it was announced Margaret and John were eloped. The two lived a rather normal life for several years, all the while the Wilkins family did not shy away from making it known how they disapproved of John. During the first weeks of the Salem Witch Trials in spring 1692, paranoia and mania swept through Danvers. Willard, being the constable, was responsible for arresting accused parties, but he could not bring himself to arrest townspeople he held in high regard. His refusal to arrest these accused witches lead to himself being accused of witchcraft. Willard became distraught at reports of the accusations leveled against him, and sought out Bray so that he and his family might pray for him. Wilkins, however, informed Willard he was to travel out of town for business later that evening, and asked him to return before nightfall. Willard was unable, and Bray did not honor his request for prayers. 1692's election period eventually rolled around and the people of the Massachusetts Bay Colony travelled to Boston to take part in the proceedings – Willard was no exception. His uncle-in-law, Bray's son Henry Wilkins, detested the claims brought against Willard by the townspeople and his own son Daniel, and so accompanied Willard for the journey. After arriving in Boston, Henry invited Willard to join him for supper at Richard Way's homestead in Dorchester, where Bray, his wife, and Deodat Lawson had already gathered. During the meal, Willard apparently gave Bray a cross look, and the patriarch suddenly found himself in a great deal of pain. The condition, probably a kidney stone, forced Bray to remain in Boston for several days. When Willard and Henry Wilkins returned to Salem, Henry's son Daniel was horribly ill. After recovering and returning to Salem as well, Bray's health seemed to relapse into illness upon the news of his grandson's condition. Ann Putnam Jr, Mary Walcott, and Mercy Lewis (with whom Daniel Wilkins was intimate at the time) were called to investigate the possibility of witchcraft, and they affirmed Willard and another Salemite named Sarah Buckley were responsible for the Daniel's fatal illness and Bray's own health problems. 

On May 10, a warrant for Willard's arrest was ratified. Willard fled to Nashaway, where he was discovered following the issue of a second warrant for his arrest. Willard was put on trial on May 18, during which Bray Wilkins testified of the very painful condition he suffered after the meal with Willard in Dorchester, saying "[Willard] lookt after such a sort upon me as I never before discerned in any." Thomas Wilkins was mortified at the proceedings against his son-in-law, and refused to take part in the trial, however, Bray's other son Benjamin testified that Mercy Lewis had recounted a vision of Willard's "apparition" afflicting the patriarch's stomach, and two of Bray's daughters and several others gave second-hand testimony that John Willard had beaten his wife Margaret and then exhibited odd behavior which frightened her into running to a relative's house for safety. During his examination, Willard denied these allegations with the rest, and desired that his wife would be called to testify on his behalf, but this does not appear to have been done. Indeed, no such frenzy is known to have occurred at any point, Margaret and John shared three children and lived a modest life. Regardless, the testimony of the Wilkins family was damning, and Willard was found guilty and hanged for witchcraft that August.

Death
Bray Wilkins died in January 1702, at age 92. His burial place is not known, though legend places in on the original foundations of Danvers/Middleton that he and Gengell built, today known as "Will's Hill", also where he died.

Marriage and descendants
Bray was only married once, the wedding probably taking place between 1632 and 1636. Per William C. Hill, Bray Wilkins had eight children:

 Samuel Wilkins Sr. (December 1636 – 20 December 1688)
 John Wilkins (22 March 1642 – 1723)
 Lydia Wilkins (25 September 1644 – 1701), who married John Nichols of Topsfield
 Thomas Wilkins (16 Mar 1647 – October 1717)
 Margaret Wilkins (12 December 1648 –  1697), who married Philip Knight Jr.
 Henry Wilkins (1 July 1651  – 8 December 1737)
 Benjamin Wilkins ( 1656 – 1715)

Hill lists the eighth child as one James Wilkins ( 1655 – ?), however, it is unlikely James was actually a son of Bray; Bray mentioned neither James nor his heirs in his will, nor did he give James land, as he did his known sons, and no one named "James" was at any time associated with any of Bray's family. John Gengell left legacies to all Bray's children in his will, but James is not mentioned here either.

Bray's wife: Hannah Gengell or Hannah Way?
The identity of Bray Wilkins' wife isn't known, but there are two candidates: Hannah Way and Hannah Gengell. Hannah Gengell is proposed to have been the sister of Bray's lifelong partner John Gengell. Neither candidate has more evidence favoring their identification over the other, however it is more likely Bray married Hannah Way as opposed to Hannah Gengell. Any mention of Bray's wife simply refers to her as "Hannah" or "Anna" and no mention of her maiden name is ever recorded in the sparse times she is ever mentioned. No record of her death is known to exist. 

William C. Hill's The Family of Bray Wilkins, Patriarch of Will's Hill, states "Bray Wilkins' wife was probably Hannah Gengell.  There is no record of the marriage to be found, which probably occurred at Dorchester between 1632 and 1636, for on the latter date Hannah Wilkins, the wife of Bray, is recorded as having been received into the First Church in Dorchester... Hannah Gengell was the sister of John Gengell, one of the incorporators of Taunton, Massachusetts, in 1643." Two persons who had access to much early documentary material about the Wilkins family, now lost, Martha J. Averill and Emily Ann Milliken née Wilkins, maintained that Bray's wife was Hannah Gengell, and furthermore the Wilkins are described with familial kindness in John Gengell’s will dated 10 April 1685.

However, a 1984 article from The American Genealogist written by David L. Greene disputes the identification of Bray's wife as a Gengell by pointing out apparent errors in Hill's work. Greene claimed Hill's main piece of support, John Gengell's will, makes the conclusion impossible, as Gengell called himself 70 in that document, and thus about 21 when Bray married Hannah (though why this fact makes it impossible for the wife of Bray Wilkins to be Hannah Gengell is suspiciously unexplained). Though Greene acknowledges that it is difficult to escape the inference that Bray and John Gengell were in some way related, he advances the following arguments: Henry Way arrived at Nantasket in 1630 (meaning he was in New England when Bray was). Emigration records record that he made the journey with his wife Elizabeth and children Samuel, Richard, Henry, and Susanna. However, as later documents would make evident, Henry Way had at least one more child who emigrated to America with him, a son named Aaron. Greene suggests this seemingly missing entry for his son Aaron Way could mean that another of Henry Way's children may very well have gone undocumented just as Aaron did. Additionally, Bray purportedly sold land to what he called his "trusty kinsman" in May 1675, one of whom was clarified as Aaron Way. Furthermore, during his testimony against Willard in 1692, Bray called Richard Way, his theoretical brother-in-law, his 'brother'. Greene also mentions one of Bray’s sons was named ‘Henry’, which he postulates was intended as the namesake of Hannah Way’s father. However, there is no reason to think that other relationships couldn’t explain the language. After all, members of a common social group might call themselves "brothers" or "cousins" without any actual blood or marital relationship. Still, it doesn’t help the case of the Gengell identification that Hannah Way is attested to while Hannah Gengell isn’t. John Gengell himself is only sparsely attested to, let alone a hypothetical sister of his, and even then, none of the surviving pieces that attest to his existence give an idea of his personal life. On the other hand,  the Way family is very well documented; manuscript summaries of the parish registers for Bridport and Allington, Dorset, in the collection of the Rev. Richard Grosvenor Bartelot, show that Henry Way married Elizabeth Batchelar on 22 Jan. 1615, (apparently as his second wife) and that they had a daughter "Hanah" who was baptized there on 3 March 1616. Additionally, while it is true and evident in John Gengell’s will that he regarded the Wilkins very highly, he very explicitly avoids calling them relatives. Coincidentally, Aaron Way is also mentioned alongside a “Mary Way” as a witness in the will.

Clarence Almon Torrey, in his 6,000 page index to what is estimated to be 99% of marriages performed in 17th century New England, asserts that Bray's wife was Hannah Way.

References

1610 births
1702 deaths
Accusers in witch trials
American city founders
People from Salem, Massachusetts
People of colonial Massachusetts
People of the Salem witch trials
Immigrants to the United States